RMA may refer to:

Business and technology 
 Rogue Music Alliance, American independent record label
 Radio Manufacturers Association, standards and trades association from 1924–1950
 Regionalmedien Austria, Austrian media company
 Reliability, Maintainability, and Availability analysis, in reliability and systems engineering
 Return merchandise authorization, returning goods to the supplier for repair or replacement
 Relationship Management Application, a service offered by SWIFT
 Rate-Monotonic Analysis, the qualitative method used to prepare a system for Rate-monotonic scheduling
 U.S. Rubber Manufacturers Association

Education 
 Randolph-Macon Academy, a preparatory school in Virginia
 Rubin Museum of Art, a museum in New York City
 Riverside Museum Associates, a non-profit that supports the Riverside Metropolitan Museum
 Royal Musical Association, British musicological organization

Government and law 
 Resource Management Act 1991, an Act of Parliament in New Zealand
 Respect for Marriage Act, a proposed bill in the United States Congress that would have repealed the Defense of Marriage Act
 Richmond Metropolitan Authority, an authority in Richmond, Virginia
 Regional Mobility Authority, an independent local government transportation agency in the U.S. state of Texas
 Risk Management Agency, an agency of the United States Department of Agriculture
 Reedley Municipal Airport, a public airport in Reedley, California

Medicine 
 Refusal of medical assistance, where a patient or their medical power of attorney refuses treatment or transport to a hospital by emergency medical services.
 Registered medical assistant, in jurisdictions where "medical assistant" is a protected title

Military 
 Rocky Mountain Arsenal, near Denver, Colorado
 Royal Marine Artillery, formerly a part of the Royal Marines
 Royal Military Academy (disambiguation), several military institutions
 Reichsmarineamt, the Admiralty of Imperial Germany's navy (historic)
 Revolution in Military Affairs, the recent rapid development of military technology and its corresponding impact on warfare

Other
 Contracted form of Real Madrid CF, a football club in Spain
 MTV Russian Music Awards
 Roma Airport, IATA airport code "RMA"